Fred Hill Sr. (July 15, 1934 – March 2, 2019) was an American football and baseball coach. He served as the head baseball coach at Rutgers University in New Brunswick, New Jersey, where he served from 1984 through 2013. He earned 13 NCAA baseball tournament bids at the school. Hill was also a head baseball and football coach for the Montclair State University Red Hawks in Upper Montclair, New Jersey. He compiled an overall college baseball coaching record of 1,089–749–9.

Coaching career

Montclair State
In seven seasons as football head coach he compiled a record of 52–16–4, including four New Jersey State Athletic Conference titles. He also led them to the school's first 10-win season in 1981. As the Red Hawks' baseball coach, Hill went 148–91–1 in seven seasons. For his highly successful coaching efforts he was inducted into the Montclair State University Hall of Fame. His jersey number was also just the third to ever be retired at MSU, joining Sam Mills and Carol Blazejowski.

Rutgers
Hill served as the Rutgers Scarlet Knights head baseball coach, a position that he held since from the 1984 through 2013 seasons. He recorded a record of 941–658–7 at Rutgers alone and sent 72 different players in 30 years to professional baseball careers. When Hill announced his retirement prior to the start of the 2014 NCAA baseball season, his 1,089 career wins ranked him 11th in college baseball history. He was named the A-10 Coach of the Year three times and Big East Coach of the Year once.

Caldwell
Hill was hired as an assistant coach of the Caldwell University Cougars baseball program in 2015, a position he stayed in for two seasons.

Kean
In 2017, Hill joined Kean University's baseball staff as an assistant coach.

Personal life
Hill's son, Fred Hill, was the Scarlet Knights men's basketball head coach. His brother is Brian Hill, a former assistant coach with the NBA's Detroit Pistons. He resided in Verona with his wife Evelyn of more than 50 years. He had 6 children (Nancy, Linda, Tracey, Karen, Jimmy and, Fred);  Hill also had 12 grandchildren (Jessica, Danielle, Steven, Brian, James, Natalie, Andrew, Caroline, Nicholas, Alexandra, Giselle, and Giancarlo). Fred Hill, Sr. attended Clifford Scott High School in East Orange, NJ. He also attended Upsala College and graduated in 1957. Fred Hill, Jr. attended Verona High School. Hill died on March 2 at the age of 84.

Head coaching record

College football

College baseball
Below is a table of Hill's yearly records as an NCAA head baseball coach.

References

External links
 Rutgers profile

1934 births
2019 deaths
American men's basketball players
Caldwell Cougars baseball coaches
Kean Cougars baseball coaches
Montclair State Red Hawks baseball coaches
Montclair State Red Hawks football coaches
Rutgers Scarlet Knights baseball coaches
Upsala Vikings baseball coaches
Upsala Vikings baseball players
Upsala Vikings men's basketball players
Upsala Vikings football players
High school baseball coaches in the United States
High school football coaches in New Jersey
Sportspeople from East Orange, New Jersey
People from Verona, New Jersey
Coaches of American football from New Jersey
Players of American football from New Jersey
Baseball coaches from New Jersey
Baseball players from New Jersey
Basketball players from New Jersey